Kattumanghattu Abraham Mar Koorilos I was the first primate and Metropolitan of the Malabar Independent Syrian Church in Kerala, India, although it was known initially as Thozhiyoor Church when established in 1772. Abraham Koorilos I is popularly known as Kattumangattu Valiya Bava.

Mar Koorilos I remained primate for 30 years from 1772 to 1802 until his death on 10 July 1802. His brother succeeded him as primate of the church as Kattumangattu Geevarghese Mar Koorilose II.

See also
 Malankara Church

Notes

References
 Vadakkekara, Benedict (2007). Origin of Christianity in India: a Historiographical Critique. Media House Delhi.

1802 deaths